Cyril Morrall or Morrell (9 February 1911 – 1975) was an English professional rugby league footballer who played in the 1930s.

Playing career

International honours
Morrell won caps for England while at Hunslet in 1938 against France, and Wales, and in 1939 against France.

Championship final appearances
Morrell played right-, i.e. number 3, in Hunslet's 8-2 victory over Leeds in the Championship Final during the 1937–38 season at Elland Road, Leeds on Saturday 30 April 1938.

Challenge Cup
Morrell played , and broke his collar bone in the 26th minute whilst scoring a try, in Hunslet's 11-5 victory over Widnes in the 1933–34 Challenge Cup Final during the 1933–34 season at Wembley Stadium, London on Saturday 5 May 1934, as interchange/substitutes were not allowed, this meant Hunslet played more than half the match with 12-men.

Personal life
In 1940, Morrell married Annie Marie Smith, niece of the late Bill Jukes, in Hunslet.

Notes

References

1911 births
1975 deaths
Castleford Tigers players
England national rugby league team players
English rugby league players
Hunslet F.C. (1883) players
Rugby league centres
Rugby league players from Leeds
Date of death missing